Guraju may refer to:
Guraju Morad Bak
Guraju Qeshlaq
Guraju Safar Shah